Tara Khēl is a village and the center of Deh Sabz District, Kabul Province, Afghanistan. The village is big, with more than 2,000 households. It is close to the Kabul International Airport. The Tarakhelis, a Pashtun tribe, are the main inhabitants of the village, thus the name Tarakhel

See also 
Kabul Province

References

Populated places in Kabul Province